The 3rd Infantry Division (3-ya Pekhotnaya Diviziya) was an infantry formation of the Russian Imperial Army that existed in various formations from 1806 until the end of World War I and the Russian Revolution. From before 1903 to the end of its existence the division was based in Kaluga.

History 
The unit was initially formed in 1806. In 1916, during World War I, the 3rd Infantry Division took part in the Brusilov Offensive. It was demobilized around the time of the Russian Revolution and the subsequent unrest.

Organization 
Russian infantry divisions consisted of a staff, two infantry brigades, and one artillery brigade. The 3rd Infantry Division was part of the 17th Army Corps as of 1914.
1st Brigade
 9th Emperor Peter the Great's Ingermanland Infantry Regiment 
 10th New-Ingermanland Infantry Regiment
2nd Brigade
 11th General Field Marshal Prince Kutuzov of Smolensk's Pskov Infantry Regiment
12th Velikiye Luki Infantry Regiment
3rd Artillery Brigade

Known commanders

Known chiefs of staff

References 

Infantry divisions of the Russian Empire
Military units and formations established in 1806
Military units and formations disestablished in 1918
Kaluga Governorate